Mettmenstetten is a railway station in the Swiss canton of Zurich, situated in the municipality of Mettmenstetten. The station is located on the Zurich to Zug via Affoltern am Albis railway line.

Service 
The station is an intermediate stop on Zurich S-Bahn line S5. During weekends, there is also a nighttime S-Bahn service (SN5) offered by ZVV.

Summary of S-Bahn services:

 Zürich S-Bahn:
 Nighttime S-Bahn (only during weekends):

References 

Railway stations in the canton of Zürich
Swiss Federal Railways stations
Railway stations in Switzerland opened in 1864